New Beith is a rural residential locality in the City of Logan, Queensland, Australia.

Geography
Large parts of New Beith are undeveloped, particularly around Round Mountain.  A majority of the locality's eastern boundary aligns with the Sydney–Brisbane rail corridor.  Residential housing has been established in the north east corner of New Beith.  The southern and eastern half of New Beith lies within the Logan River catchment while the north and west of New Beith belong to the Oxley Creek catchment.

History
The name New Beith is a reference to the town of Beith, Ayrshire, Scotland, the home town of Cecelia, wife of Richard Tyson Wilson, an early European settler.

New Beith State School was opened in March 1916 with 18 students and teacher Gladys Heany, but closed on 9 July 1950 as the combined numbers with Greenbank State School were not sufficient to support two schools in the area.

Formerly in the Shire of Beaudesert, New Beith became part of Logan City following the local government amalgamations in March 2008.

The median age of the New Beith population was 32 years, 5 years below the national median of 37. 78.5% of people living in New Beith were born in Australia. The other most frequent responses for country of birth were England 5.5%, New Zealand 3.9%, Poland 0.6%, Scotland 0.5%, Laos 0.5%. 88.2% of people spoke only English at home; the next most common languages were 1.3% Mon-Khmer, nec, 0.8% Hmong, 0.8% Samoan, 0.5% Spanish, 0.4% Polish.

In the  New Beith had a population of 4,081 people.

On 20 May 2016, areas in the south of New Beith were excised to form the new locality of Silverbark Ridge and part of the new locality of Flagstone.

Education
There are no schools in New Beith. The nearest government primary school is Greenbank State School in neighbouring Greenbank to the north. The nearest government secondary school is Park Ridge State High School in Park Ridge to the north-west.

Amenities
There is an off-leash dog park at Teviot Downs Park in Bradman Street.

References

Further reading

External links
 

Suburbs of Logan City
Localities in Queensland